The mountaineering community groups Earth's 14 mountains with summits exceeding , referred to as eight-thousanders, as a special category of peaks defining the "top of the world." Only an elite group of mountaineers can claim to have summited all 14 peaks and many have perished trying. (See eight-thousanders for current list.) Particularly since 1986 when Italian expeditionist Reinhold Messner became the first to have climbed all fourteen 8000m peaks, summiting the eight-thousanders has become the ultimate goal for many high altitude mountaineers.   Similarly, the ski-mountaineering community has set its sights on skiing from the summits of the "eight-thousanders." In a 2007 interview for the film Skiing Everest, the Italian mountaineer and skier, Hans Kammerlander articulated the challenge for the ski-mountaineering community: "Almost all peaks have been reached, almost all walls have been climbed. But seldom have the faces been skied down... It would be a lovely project if I could see someone who could ski all 8,000m peaks."

"Skiers" include those using either alpine or telemark equipment or, in two instances, a "mono ski."  The category here excludes snowboarders on the premise that the orientation of the skier's body to a slope differs significantly from that of a "boarder" affecting the capacities to negotiate a pitch. A separate entry tracks snowboard descents on 8000 meter peaks (Snowboard Descents From Above 8000m: Database). Even within the category of "skiers" equipment has evolved significantly from the time of Yuichiro Miura's first foray on skis above 8000m in 1970. Big mountain skiers have benefited greatly from incorporation of lighter and stronger composite materials into the manufacture of skis, boots and bindings, reducing the carry weight of their ski gear in addition to similar advances in designs for their other climbing gear and attire. Today's ski-mountaineer has likely shaved .) off their gear packs compared to when, for example, Sylvain Saudan hop turned down the face of Gasherbrum I in 1982, perhaps the first full descent of an 8000-meter peak.  The length, width and shape of skis has evolved to facilitate turning and flotation in deeper snow conditions. (Reports for most high altitude descents actually are far more likely to complain about hard, rutted ice than deep snow. Back country skiing whether at altitude or on the lower ranges has also seen the development of "alpine touring" bindings with detached and fixed heel configurations for use in both upslope (in the "walk" configuration) and downslope (in the "fixed-heel" configuration).

Mountaineers apply rigorous standards to define an "ascent" and its "purity."  The use of oxygen, for example, is vigorously debated, and it has become practice for trip reports to distinguish ascents supported by oxygen (O2) from those foregoing O2 use.  But for mountaineers at least the basic standard of attaining a summit with safe return is fairly absolute, the issue of documentation aside. Debate over use of O2, amount of assistance from Sherpas, line of ascent and other nits are qualifiers to the purity of the ascent. In ski mountaineering, the added dimension of the purity of the descent further muddies the standards at this time. Is the top the highest elevation of the snow line or is it the geological summit? Does a descent need to be continuous and what is the consideration for terrain in the middle of the mountain that is "un-skiable?" Does it matter if the skis come off during some portion of the descent to abseil a portion? While the standards of a mountaineering ascent still apply (including notation of O2 use), skiing, and the vagaries of "skiable" terrain add numerous variables to evaluating the purity of a descent.  Any database of ski descents is therefore likely to include heterogenous data.

Of the fourteen 8000m peaks, clearly some peaks are more skiable than others as reflected in the number of descents to date (see below). Everest, Cho Oyu, Manaslu, Gasherbrum II and Shisha Pangma have all seen more than 5 expeditions ski from above 8000 m. On the other hand, there are no reported ski descents from above 8000 m on Kangchenjunga, Makalu, and Broad Peak. Dhaulagiri and Nanga Parbat have been conquered by only one expedition each. Jamie Laidlaw made the lone descent on Lhotse but not from the summit; Hans Kammerlander skied the top 400 meters of K2 but no further. 
 
Firsts:
 1970: Yuichiro Miura (Japan) made the first ski tracks above 8000m in preparation for his epic schuss starting near the south col of Everest for the film The Man Who Skied Down Everest. 
 The honor of being first to ski from the top of an 8000m peak depends on the standard applied: Yves Morin (France) skied off the top of Annapurna in 1979 and over the course of the expedition skied all segments of the descent. However, he died while descending from the summit.   Joseph Millinger and Peter Woergoetter (both Austrian) skied from approximately 30m below the rocky knob summit of Manaslu in 1981. The top knob was most likely not skiable due to lack of snow. However, in 2011, a cornice enabled Adrian Ballinger of the United States to "ski" from the same summit. Swiss extreme skier Sylvain Saudan's 1982 3000 m descent on skis from the top of Gasherbrum I (Hidden Peak) may be the first complete descent from the top of an 8000m peak. With estimated 3000 jump turns down a continuous 50 degree pitch Saudan's run off the top of GI is in any calculation one of the most daring extreme ski runs of all time.
 1988: Veronique Perillat (France) was the first woman to ski from the top of an 8000er and the first woman to ski from over 8000 meters, skiing off the top of Cho Oyu on a monoski.  
 2000: Davo Karničar (Slovenia) completed the first top-to-bottom (base camp) descent of Everest (South Col route) without removing his skis. However, he benefited from 02 use. There has not been a similar ascent/descent of Everest without oxygen. 1996: Hans Kammerlander (Italy) skied the top 300 meters of Everest but climbed down to 7700m before skiing to Advance Base Camp. Kammerlander skied the North Col route.  
 2006: Kit DesLauriers (United States) was the first woman to ski off the top of Everest.
 2018: Andrzej Bargiel (Poland) completed the first top-to-bottom (base camp) descent of K2 (a combination of the normal route, Basque route, Messner's variant to the Polish route) without removing his skis.

Descents
Notes on compiling this database of high altitude skiers:
The 8000 meter ski database includes ski descents using alpine, telemark or mono ski equipment from above 8000m. It does not include snowboard descents. In addition to the entrant's name and peak identification, each entry details the estimated highest and lowest skied elevations, the route, use of oxygen, ski method and other very brief notes on the descent. A single reference for each entry is noted although often multiple sources are available.

Mount Everest
NEPAL/TIBET - 8850 meters

K2
PAKISTAN - 8611 meters

Kangchenjunga
NEPAL - 8586 meters

No ski descents from above 8000 meters

Lhotse
NEPAL - 8516 meters

Makalu
NEPAL - 8466

Cho Oyu
NEPAL - 8188 meters

Dhaulagiri
NEPAL - 8167 meters

Manaslu
NEPAL - 8163 meters
Benjamin Darcé -USA from 8100 (just below summit ridge)  no oxygen or Sherpa support.

Nanga Parbat
PAKISTAN - 8126 meters

Annapurna
NEPAL - 8093 meters

Gasherbrum I
- PAKISTAN - 8080 meters

Broad Peak
PAKISTAN - 8051 meters

Gasherbrum II
PAKISTAN - 8034 meters

Shisha Pangma
CHINA - 8027 meters

See also
Eight-thousander
List of highest mountains
Skiing Everest
Extreme skiing
Ski mountaineering
8000m peaks
List of ski descents in North America

Notes
For the eight Nepalese peaks, the Himalayan Database from Hawley and Salisbury is the best single reference, particularly because Elizabeth Hawley et al. often interviewed the teams and solicited trip reports enabling some verification of the claims.   Nevertheless, searching the Himalayan Database on "skiing/snowboarding" still occasionally omits expeditions who reported ski descents in their expedition notes but for some reason are not categorized under skiing/snowboarding or in several instances simply omit discussing skiing altogether in the database report. It is probably the case that information from many years ago, while admirably back filled by Hawley, focused on ascents without reference to descent by skis. For the Pakistani peaks sources include web references, the American Alpine Journal and other expedition accounts. Similar sources are referenced for Shisha Pangma in China. Little or no attempt has been made to verify claims. Disputed claims are noted in the notes. It is hoped that by publishing this preliminary database, alpinists and others will correct, update and fill out what can only be considered a preliminary attempt to accurately catalogue skiing above 8000m.

References

Eight-thousanders
Ski mountaineering
Lists of ski descents